Autologous immune enhancement therapy (AIET) is a treatment method in which immune cells are taken out from the patient's body which are cultured and processed to activate them until their resistance to cancer is strengthened and then the cells are put back in the body. The cells, antibodies, and organs of the immune system work to protect and defend the body against not only tumor cells but also bacteria or viruses.

Cell division in any living organism is an integral part of life, as worn out cells have to be replaced by newly generated cells. This process of generating new cells varies between organs and the mechanisms involved are highly complex which include the nature and capability of the underlying stem cells, their environment, metabolism, physical and allied biological factors the organ or tissue is subjected to etc., Aberrant cell division takes place that ends up in a cancer cell and such aberrance may be due to faulty stem cell, abnormal genetic components or any other factor such as radiation or a constant irritation. Cancer is still a leading cause of death in the world yet much is still not known about its mechanisms of establishment and destruction. While surgery and/or chemo- and radiotherapies are various treatment modalities available, still in many cases they don't offer a permanent cure. Another major point to be addressed about this killer disease is the relapse rate which is very high.

Researchers have found that these cells mainly target the cancer cells and not the healthy cells whereas in chemotherapy and radiotherapy the healthy cells are also getting destroyed.

Mechanism of action
Cancer cells are formed in our body almost every day but we are not affected by them. This is because they are immediately destroyed by the body's immune system. The immune system is a complex network of cells and organs comprising lymphocytes, macrophages, Dendritic cells, Natural Killer cells (NK Cell), Cytotoxic T Lymphocytes (CTL), etc., that work together to defend the body against attacks by "foreign" or "non-self" invaders including cancer cells. Immediately after a cancer cell is recognized, the Lymphocytes and/or the NK cells attack the cancer cell to kill it. When the immune system is weaker then cancer evolves as a disease and starts growing.

Each type of cancer needs a specific combination of treatments aimed at that particular kind of cancer. When the extent of spread of cancer is deep, total removal of the cancer growth by surgery may not be possible. At times, after surgical removal of a part of the cancer, radiotherapy and/or chemotherapy may be necessary to treat the remnant portion of cancer. It is widely known that Chemotherapy has profound toxic side effects and has limitations in efficacy. Radiotherapy is also a very effective mode of treatment in certain types of cancer, but it has its own adverse effects as well. These two modalities affect not only the cancer affected cells, but also the normal cells

Now in AIET, specific types of cells mainly the NK cells and T lymphocytes are isolated from the peripheral blood of the cancer patients (during remission in patients who undergo chemotherapy) by proven methods, expanded to 25–30 fold and activated and then reinfused back into the patient's body. These cells act against the cancer cells effectively and recharge the immune system. Upon encountering a tumor cell, the activated NK cell attaches to the membrane of the cancer cell and injects toxic granules which dissolve the target cell. In less than five minutes, the cancer cell dies and the NK cell moves on to its next target cancer cell. A single NK cell can destroy up to 27 cancer cells within its lifespan. This is the mechanism by which AIET is effective in cancer therapy.

History
Adoptive Immuno cell therapy of cancer was first introduced by Steven Rosenberg and his colleagues of National Institute of Health USA. In the late 80s, they published an article in which they reported a low tumor regression rate (2.6–3.3%) in 1205 patients with metastatic cancer who underwent different types of active specific immunotherapy (ASI), and they suggest that AIET with specific chemotherapy or radiotherapy as the future of cancer immunotherapy. In the beginning Immunotherapy treatments involved administration of cytokines such as Interleukin. with an aim of inducing the lymphocytes which will carry their activity of destroying the tumour cells. Thereafter the adverse effects of such intravenously administered cytokines lead to the extraction of the lymphocytes from the blood and culture-expand them in the lab and then to inject the cells alone enable them destroy the cancer cells. Till date different kinds of autologous and allogenic immune cells such as lymphokine-activated killer(LAK)cells, Natural killer (NK) cells, Activated Cytotoxic T lymphocytes(CTLs), Dendritic cells(DCs), Gene manipulated autologous and allogenic Immune cells have been used in clinical applications of Immunotherapy.

The present technology of AIET was developed by Japanese scientists and it is being widely practised in several Asian countries which uses autologous natural killer (NK) cells and activated T lymphocytes to treat various cancers.

This treatment modality has been in practice since early 90s and has several random clinical trials in lung cancer, gastric cancer, Ovarian cancer and Liver cancer. which has been published with significant disease free survival rates. One of the largest studies in 1400 patients. has proven that the cell based immunotherapy when combined with conventional treatment the efficacy improves by 20–30%. A recent finding published about a relapsed stage IV ovarian cancer treated successfully with this methodology has found its place in the Global medical discovery.

Status of immunotherapy worldwide
Though the concept of this treatment started in the US in 1980s, full-fledged clinical treatments on a routine basis have been in practice in Japan since 1990. Randomized controlled studies in different cancers with significant increase in survival and disease free period have been reported.
In India immunotherapy has shown positive results in patients with advanced cancer including acute myeloid leukaemia, pancreatic cancer, cervical cancer, ovarian cancer, Breast Cancer and Philadelphia chromosome Positive Acute Lymphoblastic Leukemia.

Relevance to Auto-Immune Diseases
Auto-Immune diseases like the Auto-Immune Hemolytic Anemia (AIHA) have been known to be associated with malignancies. In general lower Natural Killer (NK) profile has been associated with development of cancers by earlier studies. Recently an article has been published in which it has been described that the in vitro expansion of NK cells is decreased in cancer patients who have concomitant Auto-immune Diseases like the AIHA. This study also throws questions on whether AIHA is a complication of malignancies, due to the lower NK cell profile in cancer which would have given rise to the AIHA due to some common antibody between NK cells and Red Blood Cells (RBCs) or whether the AIHA lowers the NK cell profile which in turn causes the cancer. This warrants further investigations into the identification of common antibodies between NK cells & RBCs and also finding new Immuno- therapeutic strategies which can tackle both cancer and auto-immunity

References

External links
 AIET in NCRM
 Immunotherapy in Malaysia
 AIET experience by Nilai Cancer Centre, Malaysia
 A patient blog: AIET help cure sarcoma, NISCELL, Malaysia experience
 Press release on Advanced Ovarian Cancer treated with AIET
 Personal opinion of a patient who underwent autologous immune enhancement therapy, NISCELL, Malaysia
Autologous Immune Enhancement Therapy – a brief explanation
 A review on sources of NK cells, the methods for their in vitro expansion and their potential in treating cancer & viral infections
 Immune Cell Therapy Program takes shape in Vietnam through Indo-Japan Collaboration

Immunology
Cancer treatments